Héctor Manuel del Villar Martínez (23 September 1937 – 5 February 2017) was a Mexican politician affiliated with the Institutional Revolutionary Party. He served as Municipal President of Aguascalientes from 1987 to 1989.

See also
 List of mayors of Aguascalientes

References

1937 births
People from Aguascalientes City
Institutional Revolutionary Party politicians
2017 deaths
20th-century Mexican politicians
Politicians from Aguascalientes
Municipal presidents of Aguascalientes